Mademoiselle chante... is a studio album released in 1988 by the French singer Patricia Kaas. It was her debut album and was preceded by the hit singles "Mademoiselle chante le blues", Kaas' signature song, and "D'Allemagne". The album has sold three million copies.

Background 

Thanks to her first single, "Jalouse", produced by Gérard Depardieu, Kaas caught the attention of the French singer and songwriter Didier Barbelivien. The song "Mademoiselle chante le blues" (Eng: "Lady sings the blues") penned by Barbelivien was released in 1987 by Polydor and became Kaas' breakout single reaching number 7 on the French SNEP Singles Chart. The following year, Kaas' second single "D'Allemagne" (Eng: "From Germany") was released, written by Barbelivien and Bernheim. It enjoyed moderate success, peaking at number 11 on the chart.

Shortly afterwards, Kaas' first album Mademoiselle chante... was produced. All tracks on the album, except "Venus des abribus", were written by Barbelivien. Three other singles from this album were successful in France : "Mon mec à moi" (No. 5), "Elle voulait jouer cabaret" (No. 17) and "Quand Jimmy dit" (No. 10).

The three top ten singles were certified silver selling than 200,000 copies each.

It was Kaas' only studio album released by Polydor (her subsequent albums were released by Sony and Columbia).

Chart performances 

The album went to #19 on December 4, 1988, reached the top ten one month after, and peaked #2 in the French album charts, staying there for two not consecutive months. It remained in the top ten for a total of 64 weeks and 118 weeks in the top 100. It disappeared from it after the chart edition of July 18, 1991. Shortly after its debut, the album went gold in France for a minimum of 100,000 sales, and after three months it went platinum (over 350,000 sold), and finally diamond in 1990.

The album was also certified platinum in Belgium and double platinum Switzerland, and gold in Canada. Altogether Mademoiselle chante... has currently sold more than 2 million copies worldwide. In the same year Kaas won Victoires de la Musique in the category of 'Discovery of the Year', one of the most important French music awards.

Track listing

Personnel
Gilles Cappé – photography
Joël Cartigny – producer ("Mademoiselle chante le blues")
Bernard Estardy – arranger, producer
Alain Frappier – design
José Souc – guitar

Charts

Weekly charts

Year-end charts

Certifications and sales

References 

1988 debut albums
Patricia Kaas albums
Polydor Records albums